Harnam Singh is an Indian politician and leader of Communist Party of India (CPI). He represented Shahabad constituency from 1987 to 1991.

References

Communist Party of India politicians from Haryana
Haryana MLAs 1987–1991
Date of death unknown
Year of birth unknown